The 1988 All-American Bowl was a post-season American college football bowl game at Legion Field in Birmingham, Alabama between the University of Illinois Fighting Illini and the University of Florida Gators on December 29, 1988. The game was the final contest of the 1988 NCAA Division I-A football season for both teams, and ended in a 14–10 victory for Florida.

Game summary 
Head Coach John Mackovic led Illinois to a 6-4-1 record and a third-place finish in the Big Ten, reaching the All-American Bowl against the successful Southeastern Conference team from Florida. On the first play from scrimmage, Florida freshman Emmitt Smith ran 55 yards for a touchdown. Illinois tied the score on a 30-yard run by Keith Jones in the second quarter. After a fourth-quarter Doug Higgins field goal gave Illinois a three-point lead, Smith scored his second touchdown with less than four minutes remaining to give the Gators the victory.

Scoring summary

Statistical summary
Team Statistics

(Rushing-Passing-Total): UI - 55-194-249; UF - 187-69-256.

Individual Statistical Leaders

Rushing (Att.-Yds.-TD): UI - Jones 18-88-1; UF - Smith 28-159-2.

Passing (Att.-Comp.-Int.-TD-Yds.): UI - Jeff George 37-20-2-0-194; UF - Kyle Morris 12-6-2-0-50.

Receiving (No.-Yds.-TD): UI - Mike Bellamy 5-49-0; Steven Williams 5-49-0; UF - Terence Barber 4-29-0.

References

All-American Bowl
All-American Bowl
Florida Gators football bowl games
Illinois Fighting Illini football bowl games
All-American Bowl
December 1988 sports events in the United States